Köhnə Xudat or Khoudat-Baza or Kegiakhudat or Kegnakhudaf or Kekhna-Khudat or Këgna Khudat or Kegnakhudat may refer to:
Köhnə Xudat Qazmalar, Azerbaijan
Köhnə Xudat, Khachmaz, Azerbaijan
Köhnə Xudat, Qusar, Azerbaijan